The 1993 FIVB Volleyball Men's World Grand Champions Cup was held in Japan from 23 to 28 November 1993.

Qualification

Competition formula
The competition formula of the 1993 Men's World Grand Champions Cup was the single Round-Robin system. Each team plays once against each of the 5 remaining teams. Points were accumulated during the whole tournament, and the final standing was determined by the total points gained.

Squads

Venues
 Osaka-jō Hall, Osaka, Japan
 Yoyogi National Gymnasium, Tokyo, Japan

Results

|}

Osaka round

|}

Tokyo round

|}

Final standing

Team Roster
Marco Bracci, Claudio Galli, Andrea Gardini, Andrea Giani, Pasquale Gravina, Andrea Zorzi, Luca Cantagalli, Davide Bellini, Damiano Pippi, Michele Pasinato, Lorenzo Bernardi
Head Coach: Julio Velasco

External links
Results

FIVB Volleyball Men's World Grand Champions Cup
World Grand Champions Cup
FIVB Men's World Grand Champions cup
V